Events in the year 2021 in Ethiopia.

Incumbents
President: Sahle-Work Zewde
Prime Minister: Abiy Ahmed

Events
Ongoing – COVID-19 pandemic in Ethiopia – Benishangul-Gumuz conflict (since 2019) – Tigray War (since 2020)

January 
3 January – Sudan, Egypt, and Ethiopia agree to hold further talks this month to resolve their dispute over the Grand Ethiopian Renaissance Dam on the Blue Nile.
5 January – The government promises to repair the centuries-old Al Nejashi Mosque and the Orthodox Christian of Saint Emmanuel in Wukro that were damaged in December 2020 during the Tigray conflict in the Tigray conflict.
6 January
Major General Belay Seyoum admits that troops from the Eritrean Army entered Tigray Region in December 2020.
An Italian company apologizes for naming a type of pasta "Abissine," reminiscent of the colonial-era fascist name for Ethiopia.
9 January – at least 750 people are killed in an Ethiopian Orthodox Tewahedo church in Tigray. Locals blame raiders of the Lost Ark of the Covenant.
12 January
Approximately 80 civilians were killed around the village of Daletti in Metekel Zone, with opposition politicians blaming Gumuz militias.
13 January
Tigray: The government says it has killed former Foreign Minister Seyoum Mesfin and two other members of the Tigray Region′s former ruling party.
United States Senators Chris Murphy, Patrick Leahy, and Ben Cardin call for the government of Ethiopia to release journalists who have been arrested and to restore press freedom.
At least 80 civilians, including children as young as two, are killed in Benishangul-Gumuz Region in what is believed to be ethnic fighting.
22 January – The UN says it has received reports of rape in Tigray.

February
2 February – The opposition in Tigray says 50,000 civilians have been killed in the last three months.
11 February – Filsan Abdullahi Ahmed, minister for women, confirms widespread rape in the Tigray War. She noted a lack of rape kits and HIV/AIDS drugs to test and treat victims.
13 February – Demonstrators protest in Oromia Region against the deteriorating health of Bekele Gerba, Jawar Mohammed, and 18 other members of the Oromo Federalist Congress (OFC) who have been on hunger strike since 27 January. Prison officials refuse to transfer them to a hospital.
17 February – A power outage attributed to the TPLF hits Tigray. In an unrelated event, the Tigray council of religious institutions – representing Ethiopian Orthodox, Catholic, Islamic and evangelical churches – calls for the withdrawal of Eritrean forces.
19 February – The United States says it will "de-link" its suspension of millions of dollars of aid from the Grand Ethiopian Renaissance Dam. The statement implied that developments in Tigray will be considered.
20 February – The TPLF lays out eight conditions for peace in Tigray, including the appointment of an international mediator and unimpeded access for humanitarian aid.

March
1 March – Four media workers in Tigray Region, including a translator for Agence France-Presse, are arrested.
3 March
The government declares there were "credible allegations of atrocities and human rights abuses" at the Aksum massacre last November.
The four media workers in the Tigray Region are freed.
4 March – The United Nations Security Council fails to reach a consensus on a resolution to end the Tigray War.
10 March – Berhane Kidanemariam, the deputy chief of mission at the Ethiopian embassy in Washington, resigns because of disagreements over policies in Tigray.
11 March – Amhara Region spokesperson Gizachew Muluneh denies that its forces are engaged in ethnic cleansing in the Western Zone of Tigray Region, one day after United States Secretary of State Antony Blinken uses the phrase in tesimony.
15 March – Médecins Sans Frontières (MSF) reports that 70% of medical facilities in Tigray have been vandalized and looted.
18 March – Senator Chris Coons (D-DL) is sent to Ethiopia to express United States' concerns about ethnic cleansing in Tigray.
23 March – MSF says its members witnessed four civilians being dragged from a bus and murdered on the road from Mekelle to Adigrat, Tigray.
31 March – Militants related to the Oromo Liberation Army (OLA) are accused of killing dozens of civilians in Oromia Region.

April to June
8 June – Ethiopia begins filling the Grand Renaissance Dam (GERD).
18 June – Operation Alula begins
30 June - Ethiopian forces retreat from Mekelle, the capital of Tigray, ahead of the advancing Tigrayan troops.

July to September 
 29 July – Tigray conflict begins to spread as intense fighting is being reported in Ethiopia's Amhara state.
 5 August – Tigrayan rebels capture the city of Lalibela.
 10 August – Ethiopian Prime Minister Abiy Ahmed calls on civilians to join the war in Tigray.
 11 August – Ethiopian rebels TPLF and Oromo Liberation Army agree on a military alliance to fight federal Ethiopian forces.

December 
 11 December - 22 members of Kawarja Islamists are reportedly arrested in the Bale Zone of Oromia regional state of Ethiopia. According to a report by Ethiopian Broadcasting Corporation (EBC), which cited police authority from the zone, they were captured in a joint security forces operation. They have been engaged in providing training, under the cover of preaching faith, for unspecified terrorist mission.  The source also cited Oromia Broadcasting network to report that the group has members who took military training in Puntland. Kawarja Islamists terrorists were said to have been operating at least since 2011. In that year, they were linked to the destruction of 50 churches in Asendabo, South West Ethiopia.

Scheduled events 

5 June – Scheduled date for the 2021 Ethiopian general election.
TBA – The Ethiopian Accident Investigation Bureau says its report on the 2019 Ethiopian Airlines Flight 302 crash will be published in the near future.

Sports
2020–21 Ethiopian Premier League
24 August to 5 September 2021 – Ethiopia at the 2020 Summer Paralympics

Deaths
13 January – Tigray People's Liberation Front (TPLF) leaders: Seyoum Mesfin (former Ministry of Foreign Affairs, 1991–2010); Abay Tsehaye (former Minister of Federal Affairs, 2001), and Asmelash Woldeselassie (politician); killed during military action.
7 April – Mitiku Belachew, 78, Ethiopian-born Belgian surgeon.

See also

Timeline of the Tigray conflict
2021 in East Africa
COVID-19 pandemic in Africa
Grand Ethiopian Renaissance Dam
Common Market for Eastern and Southern Africa
African Continental Free Trade Area

References

 
2020s in Ethiopia
Years of the 21st century in Ethiopia
Ethiopia
Ethiopia